Gang of Gaxhai was a criminal group created in March 1997 that operated in the city of Vlora during 1997 when anarchy reigned in the South. Its criminal activity peaked during the period March–June 1997. The gang was established by Gazmend Braka, also known as Gaxhai, with some friends from the village of Cerkovinë, the city of Vlorë and other southern cities. Their main rivals were the Gang of Çole. Upon completion of the rebellion and the arrest of members of two gangs, the war between them ended.
Albanian Civil War
1997 in Albania
Albanian Mafia
Gaxhai